Santa Fe High School may refer to:

Santa Fe High School (California), in Santa Fe Springs, California, U.S.
Santa Fe High School (Florida), in Alachua, Florida, U.S.
Santa Fe High School (New Mexico), in Santa Fe, New Mexico, U.S.
Santa Fe High School (Texas), in the Santa Fe Independent School District, Santa Fe, Texas, U.S.
2018 Santa Fe High School shooting
Santa Fe Independent School District
Edmond Santa Fe High School, in Edmond, Oklahoma, U.S.

See also
Santa Fe Catholic High School, in Lakeland, Florida, U.S.
Santa Fe Indian School, Santa Fe, New Mexico, U.S.
Santa Fe Public Schools, Santa Fe, New Mexico, U.S.